Fairview is a borough in Butler County, Pennsylvania, United States. The population was 198 at the 2010 census. It should not be confused with Fairview in Erie County, which carries the ZIP code 16415.

Geography
Fairview is located in eastern Butler County at  (41.015289, -79.743303). It is surrounded by Fairview Township but is a separate entity.

Demographics

As of the census of 2000, there were 220 people, 78 households, and 64 families residing in the borough. The population density was 1,613.5 people per square mile (606.7/km2). There were 79 housing units at an average density of 579.4 per square mile (217.9/km2). The racial makeup of the borough was 98.64% White, 0.45% African American, 0.45% Native American, and 0.45% from two or more races.

There were 78 households, out of which 38.5% had children under the age of 18 living with them, 66.7% were married couples living together, 7.7% had a female householder with no husband present, and 17.9% were non-families. 14.1% of all households were made up of individuals, and 5.1% had someone living alone who was 65 years of age or older. The average household size was 2.82 and the average family size was 3.02.

In the borough the population was spread out, with 26.4% under the age of 18, 10.0% from 18 to 24, 28.6% from 25 to 44, 23.6% from 45 to 64, and 11.4% who were 65 years of age or older. The median age was 34 years. For every 100 females there were 103.7 males. For every 100 females age 18 and over, there were 92.9 males.

The median income for a household in the borough was $48,125, and the median income for a family was $50,000. Males had a median income of $39,688 versus $20,625 for females. The per capita income for the borough was $17,997. About 5.7% of families and 8.6% of the population were below the poverty line, including 15.9% of those under the age of eighteen and none of those sixty five or over.

Education
Karns City Area School District - public school
Karns City High School

References

Populated places established in 1830
Boroughs in Butler County, Pennsylvania
1830 establishments in Pennsylvania